Abū Hāshīm al-Jubbā'ī was a mu'tazili theologian. He was born in 888 in Basra, and died in 933 in Baghdad. He was the son of Abū 'Alī Muḥammad al-Jubbā'ī.

Biography 
His main teacher in theology was his own father. After the latter's death in 915, he became the leader of the Mutazilite school of Basra. Around 926, he had to leave for Baghdad because of his poverty.

Doctrine 
He is known for having introduced the theory of modes (ahwal) into theology. This theory is intended to explain the nature of the divine attributes. It will be taken up by other theologians, not only Mutazilites, but also from the rival Acharite school, like Al-Baqillani.

Abû 'Alî ibn Khallâd and Abû 'Abdullâh al-Husain ibn 'Alî al-Basrî were his students.

References 

 (fr) ʻAbd al-Raḥmān Badawī. Histoire de la philosophie en islam, p. 180 sq https://www.google.fr/books/edition/Histoire_de_la_philosophie_en_Islam/I0ANAAAAIAAJ?hl=fr&gbpv=0

Jubba'i
People from Khuzestan Province
10th-century Muslim scholars of Islam
888 births
933 deaths